The Central District of Fereydunshahr County is a district (bakhsh) in Fereydunshahr County, Isfahan Province, Iran. At the 2006 census, its population was 38,955, in 9,259 families.  The District has two cities: Fereydunshahr and Barf Anbar. The District has five rural districts (dehestan): Ashayer Rural District, Barf Anbar Rural District, Cheshmeh Langan Rural District, Pishkuh-e Mugui Rural District, and Poshtkuh-e Mugui Rural District.

References 

Fereydunshahr County
Districts of Isfahan Province